Cheiranthera linearis, commonly known as finger-flower,  is a flowering plant in the family Pittosporaceae. It is a small shrub with deep purple flowers, yellow stamens and dull green linear shaped leaves. It is found growing in New South Wales, Victoria and Queensland.

Description
The  flowers may be single or in clusters  of 2–5 on a short upright stems and 5 yellow stamens. Flowering occurs in summer and autumn.

Taxonomy and naming
Cheiranthera linearis was first formally described in 1834  by John Lindley and the description was published in Edwards's Botanical Register. The specific epithet is taken from the Latin word linearis meaning "linear", which refers to the shape of the leaves.

Distribution and habitat
Finger-flower is a widespread species found growing in woodland and forests on rocky or sandy locations in Queensland, New South Wales and Victoria.

References 

Pittosporaceae
Apiales of Australia
Flora of New South Wales
Flora of Queensland
Flora of Victoria (Australia)
Taxa named by Allan Cunningham (botanist)